"Let the Groove Get In" is a song recorded by American singer-songwriter Justin Timberlake for his third studio album, The 20/20 Experience (2013). It was written and produced by Timberlake, Timothy "Timbaland" Mosley and Jerome "J-Roc" Harmon, with additional writing from James Fauntleroy. A latin song, "Let the Groove Get In" contains sample from the recording "Alhamdulillaahi" part of the release Explore Series: Africa-Burkina Faso: Rhythms of the Grasslands (2002). Music critics received the song well and noticed a similarity between it and the works of Michael Jackson in particular his 1983 single "Wanna Be Startin' Somethin'". Following the release of The 20/20 Experience, it debuted at number 31 on the South Korea International Chart and at number nine on the US Bubbling Under Hot 100 Singles chart.

Background and production 
Timberlake started writing and recording for his third studio album in the "late part of May, first week in June" and concluded in July 2012. The project was produced in a span of 20 days. In August 2012, producer Jim Beanz reported that Timberlake started work on his new music project. However, at that time, shortly after the announcement, Timberlake's publicist revealed that there were no current plans for a new Timberlake album, affirming instead that Timberlake was working with Timbaland on songs for his upcoming project Shock Value III. Although, originally planned for release in October 2012, the album's date was postponed because of the singer's wedding with actress Jessica Biel. Timberlake's manager Johnny Wright stated that although in the project were involved artists who are also primarily and Timberlake's friends it was tough keeping the album a secret, making them use codenames for the project. The album was released on March 15, 2013, under the title The 20/20 Experience.

"Let the Groove Get In" was written by Timberlake, Timothy "Timbaland" Mosley, Jerome "J-Roc" Harmon and James Fauntleroy. The song was produced by Timbaland, Timberlake and Harmon. Timberlake arranged and produced his vocals, which were recorded at Larabee Studios in North Hollywood, California. Harmon provided keyboards for the song, while Elliot Ives played the guitar. The song was engineered by Chris Godbey, with assistance from Alejandro Baima. The song was mixed by Jimmy Douglass, Godbey and Timberlake at Larabee Studios. The Benjamin Wright Orchestra and The Regiment played the horns, while Terry Santiel provided the percussions.

Composition and lyrical interpretation 
"Let the Groove Get In" is a latin song accompanied by canned horns, propulsive percussion and Timberlake's harmonized voice over a pop arrangement made by Timbaland. It contains a sample from the recording "Alhamdulillaahi" part of the release Explore Series: Africa-Burkina Faso: Rhythms of the Grasslands (2002), an album that features field recordings collected in Africa during the 1970s. Melissa Maerz of Entertainment Weekly wrote that although the song is built on African hand-drum rhythms, later transforms into a classical Michael Jackson song, similar to the tracks from his fifth studio album Off the Wall (1979). People'''s Chuck Arnold and Jody Rosen of Rolling Stone, compared "Let the Groove Get In" to Jackson's 1983 single "Wanna Be Startin' Somethin'" from his sixth studio album Thriller (1982). Kitty Empire of The Guardian called the song a sassy and salsa-driven "earworm with a chanted chorus whose arrangements are sublime".

 Critical response 
Robert Christgau cited it as a highlight of the album. Billboard's editor Jason Lipshutz listed the song among a list of 15 pop songs "that weren't released as singles but should have been." VH1's Emily Exton wrote, "In addition to using a few of his more successful techniques (echoed call-and-response, general clapping) Timberlake dives into the sounds of the Miami Sound Machine, bringing back an electric dance number unlike anything else in his catalog."

 Credits and personnel 
Credits adapted from the liner notes of The 20/20 Experience.
Locations
Vocals recorded and mixed at Larrabee Studios, North Hollywood, California
Personnel

Timothy "Timbaland" Mosley – producer, songwriter
Justin Timberlake – Mixer, producer, songwriter, vocal producer, vocal arranger
Jerome "J-Roc" Harmon – keyboards, producer, songwriter
Yafei producer, songwriter
James Fauntleroy – songwriter
Chris Godbey – engineer, mixer
Jimmy Douglass – mixer
Alejandro Baima – assistant engineer
Elliot Ives – guitar
The Benjamin Wright Orchestra and The Regiment — horns
Terry Santiel — percussions

 Charts 

Following the release of The 20/20 Experience'', due to strong digital downloads, "Let the Groove Get In" appeared on the charts in South Korea and the United States. For the week dated March 17, 2013, the song debuted on the South Korea Gaon International Chart at number 31 with sales of 6,204 digital copies. "Let the Groove Get In" did not enter the US Billboard Hot 100, but peaked at number nine on the Bubbling Under Hot 100 Singles chart.

References 

2013 songs
Justin Timberlake songs
Songs written by Timbaland
Songs written by Justin Timberlake
Songs written by Jerome "J-Roc" Harmon
Songs written by James Fauntleroy
Song recordings produced by Timbaland
Song recordings produced by Justin Timberlake
Song recordings produced by Jerome "J-Roc" Harmon